Mill Hill station may refer to:

London 
 Mill Hill (The Hale) railway station, a disused railway station
 Mill Hill Broadway railway station, opened as "Mill Hill"
 Mill Hill East tube station, opened as "Mill Hill"

Other 
 Mill Hill railway station (Lancashire)
 Mill Hill railway station (Isle of Wight)
 Mills Hill railway station

See also
 Mills Hill railway station